{{Infobox football club 
| clubname =  Once Hermanos
| image = Once Hermanos logo.png
| image_size = 150px
| fullname =Club  Once Hermanos
| nickname =  Hermanos (Brothers)
| disbanded = 
| ground = Campo Huimanguillo  , Huimanguillo, Tabasco
| capacity = 	 
| chairman = Carlos Armando Lezama | manager =  Pedro Osorio| league = Tercera División de México
| season = Apertura 2011
| pattern_la1= |pattern_b1=_whiteV   |pattern_ra1= |
  leftarm1=990033|body1=990033|rightarm1=990033|shorts1=990033|socks1=990033|
  pattern_la2= |pattern_b2= _largereddiamondwhite |pattern_ra2= |
  leftarm2=ffffff|body2=ffffff|rightarm2=ffffff|shorts2=ffffff|socks2=ffffff|
}}Club Once Hermanos''' is a Mexican football club that plays in the Tercera División de México. The club is based in  Huimanguillo, Tabasco.The clubs takes its name after the Brothers that played for club Necaxa In the 1930s

See also
Football in Mexico
Tabasco
Necaxa
Tercera División de México

External links
Official Page

References 

Football clubs in Tabasco